Vivian E. Thomson is an American environmental policy academic. She was a professor at the University of Virginia College of Arts and Sciences from 1997 to 2017.

Life 
Thomson completed an A.B. in ecology at Princeton University. She earned an M.A. in ecology from the University of California, Santa Barbara. Thomson completed a Ph.D. in government from the University of Virginia.

Thomson was a senior air pollution analyst and manager at the United States Environmental Protection Agency. From 1997 to 2017 she was a professor in the Departments of Environmental Sciences and Politics at the University of Virginia College of Arts and Sciences. She founded and directed the interdisciplinary Environmental Thought and Practice B.A. Program.

Appointed by Virginia governor Mark Warner in 2002, Thomson served as Vice Chair and member of the State Air Pollution Control Board, a seven-member regulatory body that makes air pollution policy and approves regulations for Virginia. She was reappointed by governor Tim Kaine and served on the Board until 2010.

In 2018, Thomson's book, Climate of Capitulation, won a PROSE Award in the politics and government category.

Selected works

References 

University of Virginia faculty
Living people
Year of birth missing (living people)
Place of birth missing (living people)
Princeton University alumni
University of California, Santa Barbara alumni
University of Virginia alumni
People of the United States Environmental Protection Agency
21st-century American women writers
American women academics